In probability theory and statistics, the Zipf–Mandelbrot law is a discrete probability distribution. Also known as the Pareto–Zipf law, it is a power-law distribution on ranked data, named after the linguist George Kingsley Zipf who suggested a simpler distribution called Zipf's law, and the mathematician Benoit Mandelbrot, who subsequently generalized it.

The probability mass function is given by:

where  is given by:

which may be thought of as a generalization of a harmonic number. In the limit as  approaches infinity, this becomes the Hurwitz zeta function . For finite  and  the Zipf–Mandelbrot law becomes Zipf's law. For infinite  and  it becomes a Zeta distribution.

Applications
The distribution of words ranked by their frequency in a random text corpus is approximated by a power-law distribution, known as Zipf's law.

If one plots the frequency rank of words contained in a moderately sized corpus of text data versus the number of occurrences or actual frequencies, one obtains a power-law distribution, with exponent close to one (but see Powers, 1998 and Gelbukh & Sidorov, 2001). Zipf's law implicitly assumes a fixed vocabulary size, but the Harmonic series with s=1 does not converge, while the Zipf–Mandelbrot generalization with s>1 does. Furthermore, there is evidence that the closed class of functional words that define a language obeys a Zipf–Mandelbrot distribution with different parameters from the open classes of contentive words that vary by topic, field and register.

In ecological field studies, the relative abundance distribution (i.e. the graph of the number of species observed as a function of their abundance) is often found to conform to a Zipf–Mandelbrot law.

Within music, many metrics of measuring "pleasing" music conform to Zipf–Mandelbrot distributions.

Notes

References
  Reprinted as
 
 
 
 Van Droogenbroeck F.J., 'An essential rephrasing of the Zipf–Mandelbrot law to solve authorship attribution applications by Gaussian statistics' (2019)

External links
 Z. K. Silagadze: Citations and the Zipf–Mandelbrot's law
 NIST: Zipf's law
 W. Li's References on Zipf's law
 Gelbukh & Sidorov, 2001: Zipf and Heaps Laws’ Coefficients Depend on Language
 C++ Library for generating random Zipf–Mandelbrot deviates.

Discrete distributions
Power laws
Computational linguistics
Quantitative linguistics
Corpus linguistics